Haskerhorne  is a village in De Fryske Marren municipality in the province of Friesland, the Netherlands. It had a population of around 565 in 2017.

History
The village was first mentioned in 1333 as in Hascherahorna, and means the bend/corner near Oudehaske. In 1523, the Protestant Church was destroyed by Burgundian soldiers. In 1691, the church was replaced, and in 1915 replaced again. In 1840, it was home to 139 people.

Before 2014, Haskerhorne was part of the Skarsterlân municipality and before 1984 it was part of Haskerland.

References

External links

De Fryske Marren
Populated places in Friesland